The Ministry of Personnel, Public Grievances and Pensions is a ministry of the Government of India in personnel matters specially issues concerning recruitment, training, career development, staff welfare as well as the post-retirement dispensation.

The ministry is also concerned with the process of responsive people-oriented modern administration. Allocation of Business Rules defines the work allotted for the ministry.

Usually, though not always, the ministry is headed by the prime minister, with a minister of state reporting to him.

History 
In 1954, on the recommendation of Paul H. Appleby report, an Organisation and Methods (O&M) Division was set up in the Cabinet Secretariat. In 1964, the O&M Division was transferred to the Ministry of Home Affairs, under the newly created Department of Administrative Reforms. In 1970, on the basis of the recommendations of the Administrative Reforms Commission, the Department of Personnel was set up in the Cabinet Secretariat. In 1973, the two departments were merged to form a Department of Personnel and Administrative Reforms in the Cabinet Secretariat. In 1977, the Department of Personnel and Administrative Reforms was transferred to the Ministry of Home Affairs. And, in 1985, a full-fledged ministry was created with the name Ministry of Personnel, Public Grievances and Pensions with three separate departments under it:
 Department of Personnel and Training (this also includes recruitment of officers through UPSC and SPSC) 
 Department of Administrative Reforms and Public Grievances
 Department of Pensions and Pensioners’ Welfare

Departments
The ministry comprises three departments viz:-
Department of Personnel and Training
Department of Pension and Pensioners' Welfare
Department of Administrative Reforms & Public Grievances

Department of Personnel and Training
DOPT is concerned with the formulation of policy and the watchdog of the Government ensuring that certain accepted standards and norms, as laid down by it, are followed by all ministries/departments in the recruitment, regulation of service conditions and posting transfers and deputation of personnel as well as other related issues.

It solely controls the cadres of the Indian Administrative Service (IAS) and the Central Secretariat Service (CSS).

Organisations
DOPT supervises and controls the following organisations, namely — 
 Union Public Service Commission
 Staff Selection Commission
 Public Enterprises Selection Board
 Lal Bahadur Shastri National Academy of Administration
 Institute of Secretariat Training and Management
 Central Vigilance Commission
 Central Bureau of Investigation
 Indian Institute of Public Administration
 Central Information Commission

Department of Pension and Pensioners' Welfare
The department is mainly concerned with the formulation of policies regarding the post-retirement benefits of Central Government employees covered under the CCS (Pension) Rules, 1972. It also administers various welfare schemes for central government pensioners, i.e.,  redressal for Pensioners' grievances through CPENGRAM, an online pension sanction module for civil pensioners "Bhavishya", Sankalp, etc., under the umbrella of Pensioners' Portal. However, the pensioners of Ministries of Railways and Defence are governed by their respective pension rules.

Department of Administrative Reforms and Public Grievances
The Department of Administrative Reforms and Public Grievances is to facilitate the pursuit of excellence in governance through the promotion of: 
Improvements in Government structures and processes 
Citizen-friendly initiatives including redressal of public grievances 
Documentation, incubation and dissemination of best practices 
Codification and simplification of procedures and 
Networking with various agencies

The department acts as a facilitator, in consultation with central ministries/departments, states/UT administrations, organisations and individuals, to improve government functioning through administrative reforms in the spheres of restructuring the government, process improvement, organisation and methods and grievance handling, and by promoting modernization, Citizen's Charters, award schemes, e-governance, and best practices.

It provides online grievance redress services through Centralized Public Grievance Redress and Monitoring System.

Ministers 

The Minister of Personnel, Public Grievances and Pensions is the cabinet minister in charge of Ministry of Personnel, Public Grievances and Pensions. The position is generally held by the prime minister, but sometimes it has been held by other senior members of the cabinet, such as Minister of Home Affairs. The minister is generally assisted by a minister of state.

References

External links 
 Official Website of Ministry of Personnel, Public Grievances and Pensions
 Organisations Under MOP 
 Federal Budget of 2012 allocates nearly Rs 212 crore for training civil servants

 
Personnel, Public Grievances and Pensions
Pensions in India
India
Civil service ministries